Calasparra Photovoltaic Power Plant is a photovoltaic power station in Calasparra, Murcia in Spain.  The project consists of different production units.  Calasparra II is a 6.67 MW ground-mounted unit with estimated annual output of 11.82 GWh.  Calasparra III is a 6.6 MW units with estimated annual output of 11.7 GWh.  The project was developed by FRV and constructed by Gestamp Solar.

See also 

 Photovoltaic power stations

References 

Photovoltaic power stations in Spain
Energy in the Region of Murcia